Vinjefjorden or Vinje Fjord is a fjord in Møre og Romsdal and Trøndelag counties in Norway. It begins at the village of Vinjeøra in Heim Municipality (in Trøndelag county) and flows west through the municipalities of Aure, Tingvoll, and Kristiansund (in Møre og Romsdal county). At its western end, it flows into the Talsjøen and Freifjorden. The central part of the Vinjefjorden is called the Arasvikfjorden. European route E39 runs along the southern shore of the fjord for most of its length.

References

Fjords of Møre og Romsdal
Fjords of Trøndelag
Aure, Norway
Heim, Norway
Kristiansund
Tingvoll